Austroicetes is a genus of grasshoppers in the subfamily Oedipodinae (incertae sedis) and family Acrididae. Members of the genus typically feed on grass and herbs.

Species
Several species were placed previously in the genus Chortoicetes.  The Orthoptera Species File presently (2021) lists:

 Austroicetes arida Key, 1954
 Austroicetes cruciata (Saussure, 1888)
 Austroicetes frater (Brancsik, 1897)
 Austroicetes interioris White & Key, 1957
 Austroicetes nullarborensis Key, 1954
 Austroicetes pusilla (Walker, 1870) - type species (as Epacromia pusilla Walker)
 Austroicetes tenuicornis Key, 1954
 Austroicetes tricolor (Sjöstedt, 1920)
 Austroicetes vulgaris (Sjöstedt, 1932)

References

Acrididae genera
Oedipodinae
Taxa named by Boris Uvarov